Leola is a town in Adams County in the U.S. state of Wisconsin. The population was 308 at the 2010 census.

Geography

Demographics
At the 2000 census, there were 265 people, 107 households and 80 families residing in the town. The population density was 7.1 per square mile (2.7/km2). There were 177 housing units at an average density of 4.8 per square mile (1.8/km2). The racial makeup was 96.98% White, 0.38% African American, 1.51% Native American, 0.38% Asian, 0.75% from other races. Hispanic or Latino of any race were 0.75% of the population.

There were 107 households, of which 27.1% had children under the age of 18 living with them, 69.2% were married couples living together, 3.7% had a female householder with no husband present, and 24.3% were non-families. 19.6% of all households were made up of individuals, and 7.5% had someone living alone who was 65 years of age or older. The average household size was 2.48 and the average family size was 2.84.

19.6% of the population were under the age of 18, 5.3% from 18 to 24, 24.2% from 25 to 44, 32.5% from 45 to 64, and 18.5% who were 65 years of age or older. The median age was 45 years. For every 100 females, there were 103.8 males. For every 100 females age 18 and over, there were 99.1 males.

The median household income was $36,607 and the median family income was $38,611. Males had a median income of $29,028 and females $21,607. The per capita income was $15,699. About 7.7% of families and 10.5% of the population were below the poverty line, including 26.1% of those under the age of eighteen and none of those 65 or over.

References

External links
Town of Leola official website

Towns in Adams County, Wisconsin
Towns in Wisconsin